"Mama Say" is the debut single of the Bloodhound Gang. It was originally released as a single from the band's 1994 EP, Dingleberry Haze, but is usually associated with the 1995 album Use Your Fingers. The single features the song remixed by God Lives Underwater.

Music and lyrics 
"Mama Say" references children-oriented works and creators like "Scooby Doo," "Sesame Street" and Judy Blume. Billboard has described the track as having "the goofiest and grooviest sounds of the year."

The song samples Michael Jackson's 1983 single "Wanna Be Startin' Somethin'" in the repeated line "Mama say, mama sa mama cu sa" in its chorus; the title is taken from both this sample and the song "Soul Makossa", which inspired the Jackson tune. Another credited sample is from Duran Duran's "Save A Prayer".

Tracklist

1. Mama Say [Original Mess]*

2. Mama Say [Hip Hop Mix]**

3. Mama Say [I Didn't Get Paid Sh*T For This Mix]†

4. Mama Say [Devil's Food Cake Mix]***

Produced By Bloodhound Gang
Produced by Tony D. Mixed By Tony D. Engineered by Gary King
Produced by Jeff Turzo for Nitrus/World Seed
†Produced By Jimmy Pop

Music video
The music video consists purely of Jimmy Pop and Daddy Long Legs performing in a street for a large crowd. M.S.G. and Skip O'Pot2Mus are shown in a few shots. Lüpüs Thünder is not shown at all.

References

External links
 

Bloodhound Gang songs
1995 debut singles
Songs written by Jimmy Pop
1995 songs